The NWL Heavyweight Championship is the top professional wrestling title in the National Wrestling League promotion. It was created on March 3, 1989, when John Rambo defeated "Russian" Ivan Koloff in Elk Garden, West Virginia. The title is defended primarily in the Mid-Atlantic and East Coast, most often in Hagerstown, Maryland, but also as far west as Ohio. In October 1991, the title changed twice during a tour of Guam when Cactus Jack defeated John Rambo to win the first singles title of his career. On October 23, 1991, John Rambo regained the title from Cactus Jack in front of 15,000 fans at the University of Guam Athletic Complex.

Many former champions include ex-World Wrestling Federation veterans such as The Iron Sheik, The Patriot, Jimmy "Superfly" Snuka, Headshrinker Samu and Gangrel. Independent wrestlers Corporal Punishment and Morgus the Maniac have also held the title. There are 21 recognized known champions with a total of 38 title reigns.

Title history

References

Heavyweight wrestling championships